The von Trapps (formerly The von Trapp Children) was a musical group made up of Sofia, Melanie, Amanda, and August (formerly Justin) von Trapp, descendants of the original Trapp Family Singers. They are the grandchildren of Werner von Trapp, who was portrayed as Kurt in The Sound of Music, and the great-grandchildren of Georg Ritter von Trapp and his first wife Agathe Whitehead, and the step-great-grandchildren of Maria von Trapp, Georg's second wife.

History
The von Trapps began their singing career in 2001 after recording the folk songs taught to them by their grandfather Werner von Trapp. They subsequently toured in North America, China, Southeast Asia, and Europe for over 15 years. They frequently performed with the band Pink Martini, and their collaboration album, Dream a Little Dream, was released in March 2014.

The von Trapps appeared on The Oprah Winfrey Show, The View, Jack Hanna's Into the Wild, The Today Show and 19 Kids and Counting. In March 2016, The von Trapps announced that after 15 years of performing together, they would be closing the chapter in their lives as full-time musicians. Their last performance as a group, "Final Farewell Show", took place in their hometown of Portland, Oregon on May 3, 2016.

Discography

Studio albums

Collaboration studio albums

As featured artist

EPs

DVD

Awards
In 2006, the von Trapp Children were given the Special Award for Outstanding Young Family Singing Group at the 27th annual Young Artist Awards.

References

American musical groups
Family musical groups
Trapp family